Xanthodura is a genus of moths in the family Geometridae. It was first described by Arthur Gardiner Butler in 1880 and is found on Madagascar.

Species
Xanthodura hypocrypta L. B. Prout, 1925
Xanthodura trucidata Butler, 1880

References
 Butler, 1880. Annals and Magazine of Natural History (5)5: 385

Geometrinae
Geometridae genera